"Almost a Memory Now" is a song written by Van Stephenson, Dave Robbins, and Dale Oliver, recorded by American country music band  Blackhawk. It was released in February 1996 as the third single from their album Strong Enough. It peaked at #11 on the United States Billboard Hot Country Singles & Tracks, and #14 on the Canadian RPM Country Tracks.

Content
The song's narrator confirms that his former lover now that she's gone is "almost a memory now."

Critical reception
Deborah Evans Price, of Billboard magazine reviewed the song favorably, calling it a "stunning ode to lost love." She goes on to call the production "full and rich, buoyed by the trio's outstanding harmonies and accented by the tasty mandolin flourishes that are part of the act's distinctive sound."

Music video
The music video was directed by Jim Shea/Michael Salomon and premiered in early 1996. It was filmed in New Orleans, Louisiana.

Chart performance
"Almost a Memory Now" debuted at number 61 on the U.S. Billboard Hot Country Singles & Tracks for the week of February 24, 1996.

References

1995 songs
Blackhawk (band) songs
1996 singles
Songs written by Dave Robbins (keyboardist)
Songs written by Van Stephenson
Arista Nashville singles
Song recordings produced by Mark Bright (record producer)